The 1997 Women's European Water Polo Championship was the seventh edition of the European Water Polo Championship, organised by the Ligue Européenne de Natation. The event took place in Seville, Spain from August 13 to August 22, 1997, part of the European LC Championships 1997.

Teams

Group A

 

 
 
 

Group B

Preliminary round

Group A

August 13, 1997

August 14, 1997

August 15, 1997

August 16, 1997

August 17, 1997

Group B

August 13, 1997

August 14, 1997

August 15, 1997

August 16, 1997

August 17, 1997

Quarterfinals
August 19, 1997

Play-Offs
August 20, 1997

Semifinals
August 20, 1997

Finals
August 22, 1997 — Ninth place

August 22, 1997 — Seventh place

August 22, 1997 — Fifth place

August 22, 1997 — Bronze Medal

August 22, 1997 — Gold Medal

Final ranking

Individual awards
Most Valuable Player
???
Best Goalkeeper
???
Topscorer
???

References
 Zwemkroniek (September, 1997)
 Coniliguria

Women
1997
International water polo competitions hosted by Spain
Women's water polo in Spain
European Championship
Water polo